Syritta dilatata is a species of syrphid fly in the family Syrphidae.

Distribution
Madagascar.

References

Eristalinae
Diptera of Africa
Insects described in 1971